Flagtail Mountain is a summit in Grant County, Oregon, in the United States with an elevation of  .

References

Mountains of Grant County, Oregon
Mountains of Oregon